Aşağıkonak is a village in the Cizre District of Şırnak Province in Turkey. It is populated by Kurds of the Tayan tribe, and had a population of 544 in 2021.

References 

Villages in Cizre District
Kurdish settlements in Şırnak Province